Spilarctia cervina is a moth in the family Erebidae. It was described by Hans Daniel Johan Wallengren in 1860. It is found on Sumatra and the Mentawai Islands of Indonesia.

Subspecies
Spilarctia cervina cervina (Sumatra)
Spilarctia cervina pseudoamilada Dubatolov, 2010 (Indonesia: Mentawai Islands)

References

Moths described in 1860
cervina